The Taifa of Lorca was a medieval Islamic Moorish taifa kingdom centered in what is now southern Spain.

The taifa was founded in 1042, when Lorca declared its independence from the emirate of Valencia. Its first governor was Ma'n Ibn Sumadih, with its power base extending from the city to Jaén and Baza.

In 1228, the Lorca taifa was re-established after the fall of the Almoravid dynasty. It lasted until around 1250, when it was conquered by the taifa of Murcia.

List of Emirs

Ahlid dynasty
Abu 'Abd Allah Muhammad: 
To Murcia:

See also
 List of Sunni Muslim dynasties

Lorca
1250 disestablishments in Europe
States and territories established in 1228
Region of Murcia
Lorca, Spain